The Socorro parakeet (Psittacara brevipes) is a species of parrot endemic to Socorro Island in the Revillagigedo Islands, Mexico. Some ornithologists consider it to be a subspecies of the green parakeet (Psittacara holochlorus). Its natural habitat is tropical and subtropical moist broadleaf forests. The Socorro parakeet's mating season starts in November.

Status
It is threatened by habitat destruction due to feral sheep and predation by feral cats. At present, there is no clear evidence of population decline. However, due to the restricted distribution and small population size of this species, it may meet the IUCN criteria for a vulnerable species.

References

External links
BirdLife Species Factsheet.

Endemic birds of Mexico
Natural history of the Revillagigedo Islands
Socorro parakeet
Socorro parakeet
Socorro parakeet
Taxonomy articles created by Polbot
Taxobox binomials not recognized by IUCN